An incremental compiler is a kind of incremental computation applied to the field of compilation. Quite naturally, whereas ordinary compilers make a so-called clean build, that is, (re)build all program modules, an incremental compiler recompiles only modified portions of a program.

Definition

Imperative programming
In imperative programming and software development, incremental compilation takes only the changes of a known set of source files and updates any corresponding output files (in the compiler's target language, often bytecode) that may already exist from previous compilations.
By effectively building upon previously compiled output files, an incremental compiler avoids the wasteful recompiling of entire source files, where most of the code remains unchanged. For most incremental compilers, compiling a program with small changes to its source code is usually near instantaneous.
It can be said that an incremental compiler reduces the granularity of a language's traditional compiling units while maintaining the language's semantics, such that the compiler can append and replace smaller parts.

Many programming tools take advantage of incremental compilers to provide developers with a much more interactive programming environment. It is not unusual that an incremental compiler is invoked for every change of a source file, such that the developer is almost immediately informed about any compilation errors that would arise as a result of his changes to the code. This scheme, in contrast with traditional compilation, shortens a programmer's development cycle significantly, because they would no longer have to wait for a long compile process before being informed of errors.

One downside to this type of incremental compiler is that it cannot easily optimize the code that it compiles, due to locality and the limited scope of what is changed. This is usually not a problem, because for optimization is usually only carried out on release, an incremental compiler would be used throughout development, and a standard batch compiler would be used on release.

Interactive programming
In the interactive programming paradigm, e.g. in Poplog related literature, and  an interactive compiler refers to a compiler that is actually a part of the runtime system of the source language. The compiler can be invoked at runtime on some source code or data structure managed by the program, which then produces a new compiled program fragment containing machine code that is then immediately available for use by the runtime system. If the newly compiled fragment replaces a previous compiled procedure the old one will be garbage collected. This scheme allows for a degree of self-modifying code and requires metaprogramming language features. The ability to add, remove and delete code while running is known as hot swapping. Some interactive programming platforms mix the use of interpreted and compiled code to achieve the illusion that any changes to code are accessible by the program immediately.

List of incremental compilers
Imperative and functional languages
 The PECAN Programming Environment Generator was an incremental compiler, developed by Steven P. Reiss in the early 1980s.
 GNU Compiler Collection has branched off its development with the IncrementalCompiler project, concentrating in providing C/C++ with a fast incremental compiler
 The Eclipse platform has included an incremental compiler for Java as a part of the Java Development Tools project
 The Gradle build tool has supported incremental Java compilation since version 2.1.
 IBM VisualAge C++ compiler 4.0
 Embarcadero Delphi
 The .NET Compiler Platform (C# and Visual Basic .NET)
 Rust
 Go
 Forth
 Ceylon
 OCaml
 GNAT, the GNU Ada compiler
 PTC ObjectAda

Interactive environments and runtime systems
 Poplog (its core language POP-11 and its predecessor POP-2)
 Versions of Lisp:
 Steel Bank Common Lisp
 Carnegie Mellon University Common Lisp
 Scieneer Common Lisp
 GNU CLISP
 Franz Allegro Common Lisp
 Versions of Scheme:
 Ikarus
 Chez Scheme
 Versions of Prolog:
 SWI-Prolog
 Yap Prolog
 XSB
 Versions of ML:
 Standard ML of New Jersey (Bell Labs' headquarters resides in New Jersey)
 Poplog ML

See also
 Dynamic compilation

References

External links
Dr. Dobb's Journal about making an incremental C++ compiler
R. Smith, A. Sloman and J. Gibson, POPLOG's two-level virtual machine support for interactive languages, in Research Directions in Cognitive Science Volume 5: Artificial Intelligence, Eds. D. Sleeman and N. Bernsen, Lawrence Erlbaum, 1992, pp 203–231

Compilers
Incremental computing